Andrew S. Boutros is an American lawyer, law professor, and former federal prosecutor best known for prosecuting corporate fraud and cybercrime cases (most notably, Chicago's Silk Road cases). In 2015, the Federal Law Enforcement Officers Association honored him with the National Prosecutorial Award, and he was also elected to the American Law Institute the same year. He is the  Regional Chair of Dechert LLP's White Collar practice, where he is resident in the firm's Chicago and DC offices.

Education and early career

Boutros is a first-generation American whose parents emigrated from Egypt. He earned his undergraduate degree from Virginia Tech where he graduated in-honors summa cum laude. He then went on to the University of Virginia School of Law where he earned his J.D. in 2001. Jeffrey O'Connell was one of Boutros' academic mentors while in law school. The two authored an article on aspects of tort reform that appeared in the Notre Dame Law Review. Following law school, Boutros clerked for the Honorable Eugene E. Siler Jr. of the United States Court of Appeals for the Sixth Circuit. After graduating, he worked as a defense attorney in the Washington, D.C. office of an international law firm. He helped launch and run the firm's Foreign Corrupt Practices Act (FCPA) group.

U.S. Department of Justice

In 2007, Boutros was hired by U.S. Attorney, Patrick Fitzgerald, to work as an Assistant U.S. Attorney for the Northern District of Illinois. He relocated to Chicago for the job and started work on January 7, 2008. He was a key member of the Financial Crimes and Special Prosecutions unit at the office. Over the course of his nearly 8-year career, Boutros prosecuted notable cases involving white collar crimes, fraud, laundering, drug trafficking, cybercrime, and more.

Some of his most notable work involved the prosecution of individuals involved in the Silk Road online "black market." He assisted in the prosecution of the founder of the Silk Road, Ross Ulbricht, who received a life sentence after conviction. He also led the prosecution and conviction of the individual referred to as the Silk Road's "most prolific online drug dealer," Cornelis Jan "SuperTrips" Slomp. Boutros' prosecution led to a ten-year prison sentence for Slomp in May 2015.

Boutros was also the prosecutor for what was known as "largest food fraud in U.S. history" (or "Honeygate"). The first phase of the law enforcement operation involved individuals and companies that had been involved in the illegal importation of cheap and occasionally contaminated honey from China. The food fraud and criminal antidumping duty case led to $80 million in losses. The second phase of the operation focused on individuals and companies who were illegally buying and shipping the illegally imported Chinese honey. The fraud in the second phase of the operation amounted to $180 million in losses. The total amount of fraud involved in the so-called "Project Honeygate" was worth $260 million.

One of Boutros' other significant prosecutions was among his first cases and involved healthcare prosecution. Boutros charged Peter G. Rogan, who owned the Edgewater Medical Center in Chicago and owed $188 million in civil judgments largely for Medicare fraud, with perjury and obstruction of justice in 2008. Rogan evaded capture in Canada for seven years. In Boutros' last act as a federal prosecutor in 2015, he represented the government in the case against Rogan. Rogan was sentenced to 21 months in prison.

Private practice and teaching

In October 2015, Boutros was hired by Chicago-based law firm, Seyfarth Shaw, to be National Co-Chair of its White Collar, Internal Investigations and False Claims practice, thereby ending his nearly 8-year career with the U.S. Attorney's Office in Chicago. In September 2019, it was announced that Boutros joined the international law firm of Dechert LLP as Regional Chair of the U.S. white collar practice. He works in both the Chicago and Washington offices of Dechert. Since 2011, Boutros has also been teaching law at the University of Chicago Law School. He teaches an advanced course on corporate criminal prosecutions and investigations.

Recognition and awards

Boutros has been recognized by numerous organizations since beginning his career. He is a member of the American Law Institute and the American Bar Foundation. He is also the national co-founder and co-chair of the American Bar Association's (ABA) Criminal Justice Section's Global Anti-Corruption Committee and is a voting member of the ABA Criminal Justice Section Council. The Federal Law Enforcement Officers Association honored him with the National Prosecutorial Award in 2015, and the ABA honored him with the Norm Maleng Minister of Justice Award in 2014.

Publications
 "Treating Medical Malpractice Claims under a Variant of the Business Judgment Rule", with Jeffrey O'Connell, 77 Notre Dame Law Rev. 373 (2002)
 "Deferred Prosecution Agreements: A View from the Trenches and a Proposal for Reform", with F. Joseph Warin, 93 Va. L. Rev. Brief 121 (2007-2008)
 "Carbon Copy Prosecutions: A Growing Anticorruption Phenomenon in a Shrinking World", with T. Markus Funk, 2012 U. Chi. Legal F. 259 (2012)
 "Another Bite at the Apple: Transnational Crimes Face Repeat Punishment", 39 Litig. 43 (2013)
 The ABA Compliance Officer's Deskbook, with James T. O'Reilly, T. Markus Funk (2018)

References

External links
University of Chicago Law School profile of Andrew S. Boutros

American lawyers
Living people
University of Virginia School of Law alumni
University of Chicago Law School faculty
Year of birth missing (living people)
Virginia Tech alumni
American people of Egyptian descent